The Jonesboro, Lake City & Eastern Railroad Depot is a historic former railroad station in Manila, Arkansas.  It is a modest single-story wood-frame structure with a gable roof, standing at the northwest corner of South Dewey and Baltimore Streets.  The station was built in 1910 by the Jonesboro, Lake City and Eastern Railroad, and is a well-preserved example of a wood-frame board-and-batten station of the period.  It is now owned by the city.

The depot was listed on the National Register of Historic Places in 1997.

See also
National Register of Historic Places listings in Mississippi County, Arkansas

References

Railway stations on the National Register of Historic Places in Arkansas
Railway stations in the United States opened in 1910
National Register of Historic Places in Mississippi County, Arkansas
Manila
Former railway stations in Arkansas
1910 establishments in Arkansas
Transportation in Mississippi County, Arkansas